SS Mary Ball was a Liberty ship built in the United States during World War II. She was named after Mary Ball, the mother of George Washington, the first President of the United States.

Construction
Mary Ball was laid down on 20 July 1943, under a Maritime Commission (MARCOM) contract, MC hull 1534, by J.A. Jones Construction, Panama City, Florida; she was launched on 17 October 1943.

History
She was allocated to United Fruit Co., on 23 November 1943. On 20 June 1946, she was laid up in the National Defense Reserve Fleet, in Mobile, Alabama. On 28 October 1971, she was sold, along with 13 other ships, for $513,800, to Union Minerals and Alloys Corporation, to be scrapped. She was removed from the fleet on 17 April 1972.

References

Bibliography

 
 
 
 

 

Liberty ships
Ships built in Panama City, Florida
1943 ships
Mobile Reserve Fleet